Björn Karl Håkan Corneliusson (born 17 November 1976) is a Swedish former professional footballer who played as a defender. Starting off his career with Örgryte IS, he went on to play professionally for AIK, Salernitana, Napoli, and Landskrona BoIS during a career that spanned between 1994 and 2007. He won nine caps for the Sweden national team between 2000 and 2001, scoring one goal.

Club career 
Corneliusson began his footballing career with Örgryte IS, before signing with AIK ahead of the 1999 Allsvenskan season. While at AIK, he was a part of the team that competed in the 1999–2000 UEFA Champions League, as well as won the 1998–1999 Svenska Cupen.

After the 2003 Allsvenskan season, he left AIK to sign for Salernitana in the Italian Serie B. The following season, he was loaned out to Napoli in Serie C. In 2005, he returned home to Sweden to sign for Landskrona BoIS.

International career

Youth 
Corneliusson made a total of 39 appearances for the Sweden U17, U19, and U21 teams, and was a part of the Sweden U21 team that finished 6th at the 1998 UEFA European Under-21 Championship in Romania.

Senior 
He made his full international debut for Sweden on 4 February 2000 in a friendly game against Norway, coming on as a substitute for Teddy Lucic in the 71st minute in a game that ended in a 0–1 loss. Later that year, he made his competitive debut for Sweden in a 2002 FIFA World Cup qualifier against Turkey, replacing Niclas Alexandersson in the 55th minute and picking up a yellow card in a 1–1 draw.

He scored his first goal for Sweden on 28 February 2001 in a friendly game against Malta, scoring the first goal in a 3–0 win. He won his 9th and final international cap on 25 April 2001 in a 2-0 friendly win against Switzerland.

Despite appearing in three 2002 FIFA World Cup qualifiers, he was not called up to Sweden's 2002 FIFA World Cup squad after injuring his hand only a month before the tournament.

Career statistics

International 

Scores and results list Sweden's goal tally first, score column indicates score after each Corneliusson goal.

Honours 
AIK
 Svenska Cupen: 1998–1999
Individual
 Isidorpriset: 2000

References

1976 births
Living people
Swedish footballers
Sweden youth international footballers
Sweden under-21 international footballers
Swedish expatriate footballers
Allsvenskan players
Serie B players
Örgryte IS players
AIK Fotboll players
U.S. Salernitana 1919 players
S.S.C. Napoli players
Landskrona BoIS players
Expatriate footballers in Italy
Association football defenders
Sweden international footballers
Footballers from Gothenburg